Euthyone dremma is a moth of the subfamily Arctiinae. It is found in Guyana.

References

 Natural History Museum Lepidoptera generic names catalog

Lithosiini